The Irish Statute Book, also known as the electronic Irish Statute Book (eISB), is a database produced by the Office of the Attorney General of Ireland. It contains copies of Acts of the Oireachtas and statutory instruments. It also contains a Legislation Directory which includes chronological tables of pre-1922 legislation. It is published on a website (irishstatutebook.ie) and was formerly published on CD-ROM.

In 2001 the Irish Law Times said that, whilst the Attorney General's staff deserved to be congratulated for the Irish Statute Book, the CD-ROM version contained a "significant number of errors".

See also
Law of the Republic of Ireland

References
Irish Statute Book. N-Lex.
OECD (2010). Better Regulation in Europe: Ireland 2010. OECD Publishing. . Page 93. Digitized copy from Google Books. .
Ruth O'Flaherty. "The Provision of Library and Research Services in the Office of the Attorney General – a Law Office of the State". Legal Information Management. Cambridge University Press. Volume 11. Issue 3. September 2011. pp 195 – 197. .

External links

Law of the Republic of Ireland